Lingshui Airbase is a military air base located on Hainan Island, China. The airbase is a highly strategic location, being part of the Southern Theater Command, and within easy flying distance of the disputed islands in the South China Sea. Hainan Island is also host to a second military air base - Sanya Air Base.

History
The airbase was the focus for the aftermath of what became known as the Hainan Island incident, when a US signals intelligence aircraft was forced to make an unauthorised landing there on April 1, 2001.

Analysis of Google Earth imagery since 2004 shows Lingshui Airbase is undergoing extensive redevelopment of its aircraft parking areas.

Operations
Lingshui was one of the Chinese bases which supported the Guizhou Soar Dragon, although recent imagery has not confirmed the UAVs presence. Imagery analysis and open source information reports that Anti-submarine warfare and airborne early warning aircraft have been deployed to the airbase.

References

Airports in Hainan
Chinese Air Force bases